Bartonella chomelii is a Gram-negative, oxidase- and catalase-negative bacteria from the genus Bartonella with a unipolar flagellum which was isolated from a domestic cattle (Bos taurus). Bartonella chomelii is named after Bruno B. Chomel.

References

External links
Type strain of Bartonella chomelii at BacDive -  the Bacterial Diversity Metadatabase

Bartonellaceae
Bacteria described in 2004